Robin Schoonbrood (born 29 May 1999) is a Dutch football player.

Club career
He made his Eerste Divisie debut for Jong PSV on 7 September 2018 in a game against Jong FC Utrecht as a 61st-minute substitute for Marlon Frey.

References

External links
 

1999 births
Footballers from Tilburg
Living people
Dutch footballers
Netherlands youth international footballers
Association football midfielders
Jong PSV players
Roda JC Kerkrade players
Eerste Divisie players